Replicante is a Mexican cultural and literary online magazine. Founded in 2004, the magazine, which was printed quarterly, covers a central theme in each issue, such as art, sex, or cities. Regular sections are also included.

The magazine seeks to be an alternative to Nexos and Letras Libres.

The editorial director is Rogelio Villarreal, well known in Mexico's counterculture. Villarreal was the publisher of the countercultural magazines La Regla Rota (The Broken Rule) and La Pusmoderna. Replicante is his first attempt to reach a more mainstream public.

In 2009 Replicante ended print publication and went on online.

References

External links

Press coverage of the magazine

2004 establishments in Mexico
2009 disestablishments in Mexico
Cultural magazines
Defunct literary magazines
Defunct magazines published in Mexico
Magazines established in 2004
Magazines disestablished in 2009
Literary magazines published in Mexico
Online literary magazines
Online magazines with defunct print editions
Quarterly magazines
Spanish-language magazines